Iskra is a village in Dryanovo Municipality, in Gabrovo Province, in northern central Bulgaria. As of 2015, the population of the village is 2.

References

Villages in Gabrovo Province